Ronald Alexander Fischer (born April 12, 1959) is a Canadian-born German former professional ice hockey defenceman.  He played eighteen games in the National Hockey League with the Buffalo Sabres between the 1981–82 and 1982–83 seasons, recording seven assists. The rest of his career, which lasted from 1981 to 1996, was mainly spent playing in Germany for Star Bulls Rosenheim. Internationally Fischer played for both the West German and German national teams at multiple tournaments, including the 1988 and 1992 Winter Olympics.

Fischer was born in Merritt, British Columbia.

Career statistics

Regular season and playoffs

International

External links
 

1959 births
Living people
Buffalo Sabres players
Calgary Dinos ice hockey players
Canadian expatriate ice hockey players in Germany
Canadian ice hockey defencemen
Edmonton Oil Kings (WCHL) players
Ice hockey people from British Columbia
Ice hockey players at the 1988 Winter Olympics
Ice hockey players at the 1992 Winter Olympics
Olympic ice hockey players of Germany
Olympic ice hockey players of West Germany
People from the Thompson-Nicola Regional District
Rochester Americans players
Sherwood Park Crusaders players
Starbulls Rosenheim players
Undrafted National Hockey League players